Zaid al-Rifai (born 27 November 1936 in Amman, Jordan) is a Jordanian politician that served as the 22nd Prime Minister of Jordan from April 1984 to April 1989.

Biography

He served as Prime Minister of Jordan and formed four different governments, the last of which was Jordan's longest lasting government in the history of the kingdom. It lasted for a term of 5 years and 23 days from (4 April 1984 to 27 April 1989). His father, Sameer al-Rifai, father-in-law, Bahjat Talhouni and his son, Samir Rifai all served as Jordanian prime minister.

Zaid al-Rifai was the President of the Senate of Jordan from June 1997 to December 2009. On 12 December 2009, he resigned from office.

See also 
 List of prime ministers of Jordan

References

External links

 Prime Ministry of Jordan website

Prime Ministers of Jordan
Presidents of the Senate of Jordan
1936 births
Living people
Jordanian people of Palestinian descent
Government ministers of Jordan
Foreign ministers of Jordan
Defence ministers of Jordan
Victoria College, Alexandria alumni
Harvard University alumni
Jordanian diplomats
Ambassadors of Jordan to the United Kingdom
Members of the Senate of Jordan
Children of national leaders